Glenn D. Holtzman (October 9, 1930May 6, 1980) was a professional American football defensive tackle in the National Football League. He played four seasons for the Los Angeles Rams (1955–1958).

1930 births
1980 deaths
Players of American football from Shreveport, Louisiana
People from Kilgore, Texas
Players of American football from Texas
American football defensive tackles
Kilgore Rangers football players
North Texas Mean Green football players
Los Angeles Rams players